Walkersville is a town in Frederick County, Maryland, United States. The population was 5,800 at the 2010 census.

History
Crum Road Bridge was listed on the National Register of Historic Places in 1978. The Woodsboro and Frederick Turnpike Company Tollhouse was listed in 1979 and Harris Farm in 1994.

Geography
Walkersville is located at  (39.484846, -77.348943).

Transportation
The primary method of travel to and from Walkersville is by road. Maryland Route 194 is the only significant highway serving the town. MD 194 traverses the region southwest-to-northeast, providing connections to Maryland Route 26 and the Frederick area to the south, and to Woodsboro and Taneytown to the north.

Demographics

The median income for a household in the town was $65,581, and the median income for a family was $69,476. Males had a median income of $47,309 versus $31,817 for females. The per capita income for the town was $24,103. About 2.1% of families and 2.4% of the population were below the poverty line, including 2.3% of those under age 18 and 4.0% of those age 65 or over.

2010 census
As of the census of 2010, there were 5,800 people, 2,094 households, and 1,583 families residing in the town. The racial makeup of the town was 88.0% White, 5.2% African American, 0.3% Native American, 2.4% Asian, 1.5% from other races, and 2.6% from two or more races. Hispanic or Latino of any race were 4.1% of the population.

There were 2,094 households, of which 40.1% had children under the age of 18 living with them, 61.4% were married couples living together, 10.6% had a female householder with no husband present, 3.6% had a male householder with no wife present, and 24.4% were non-families. 21.5% of all households were made up of individuals, and 11.2% had someone living alone who was 65 years of age or older. The average household size was 2.71 and the average family size was 3.16.

The median age in the town was 40.6 years. 26.1% of residents were under the age of 18; 6.9% were between the ages of 18 and 24; 24% were from 25 to 44; 29.9% were from 45 to 64; and 13.3% were 65 years of age or older. The gender makeup of the town was 47.6% male and 52.4% female.

Community 

There are four schools in the town of Walkersville: Glade Elementary, Walkersville Elementary, Walkersville Middle, and Walkersville High. The mascot of Glade Elementary is the Jaguar.  The mascot of the other schools is the Walkersville Lion and the rival school are the Middletown Knights.  There is also an Adult Education center on W. Frederick St., across from the middle school.

Some activities in Walkersville are participating in the Glade Valley Athletic Association (GVAA) where kids 5-18 can participate in baseball, softball, soccer, basketball, football, lacrosse, wrestling, poms and cheerleading. There are also active Boy Scout and Girl Scout troops.

There are four parks within the local area of Walkersville: Walkersville Community Park, Heritage Farm Park, Creamery Park, and Gilmore C. Trout Memorial Park.

Baseball, Softball, soccer and lacrosse fields, playground equipment, a running loop, and covered pavilions are found at Heritage Farm Park. Tennis courts can be found at Walkersville Community Park along with a one-mile paved trail.

Walkersville has a fire hall, where various activities are held, including cookouts, auctions, and the annual Volunteer Fire Company Carnival which occurs over the week of July 4.

Town meetings are held at the Town Hall on the second and fourth Wednesdays of each month.

The town also includes a variety of shops, including Rutter's, Safeway, Sheetz, Olde Towne Jewelers, and various others. Fast food establishments include McDonald's and Pizza Hut.

The Walkersville Southern Railroad offers regularly scheduled scenic train rides from the month of May through October. The train was part of the Pennsylvania Railroad that was built in 1872.

Walkersville is served by TransIt, the Frederick County bus system.

In May 2008, Walkersville commissioners passed Resolution 2008-4 becoming the second town in Maryland to adopt English as the town's official language.

References

Towns in Maryland
Towns in Frederick County, Maryland